Vážení přátelé, ano  is a Czech comedy film. It was released in 1989.

External links
 

1989 films
Czechoslovak comedy films
1989 comedy films
Czech comedy films
Films scored by Petr Hapka
1980s Czech films